Aupark Tower is a high-rise building in Bratislava located in the district of Petržalka which is a part of the shopping center Aupark. It was built by the HB Reavis Group company in 2007. In 2012, Heitman European Property Partners IV purchased the building for €85.6m. Currently, the office space of the building is occupied by a number of tenants, including Telefónica O2 Slovakia, Eset, Procter & Gamble and AT&T, among others.

History 

The construction began in 2006, the framework was completed in the beginning of 2007 and it was completely finished by the end of 2007.

The building was approved by then mayor of Petržalka Vladimír Bajan, but the mayor of Bratislava Andrej Ďurkovský is also commonly blamed, as well as the Bratislava main architect Štefan Šlachta.

It has a staged shape and stands at a height of 96 meters, 22 floors and there were proposals to reduce it to 15 floors in order to allegedly save the panorama of Bratislava. The HB Reavis Group company was offered some lucrative ground on the Petržalka Danube-riverbank between the Old Bridge and the Apollo Bridge for a favorable cost. This solution was not realized, however, as it was decided that it would have been unprofitable for the city.

Controversy 
Aupark Tower altered a large number of Bratislava silhouettes due to its height and location. Many pictures in the historical Old Town can no longer be taken without inclusion of this structure. Opposers of the building also argued that the immediate vicinity of the New bridge and that the building optically devalues the Aupark (Sad Janka Kráľa) locality.

Gallery

See also 
 Aupark
 Sad Janka Kráľa

References 

Buildings and structures in Bratislava
Buildings and structures completed in 2007